Pegasus Airlines, sometimes stylized as Flypgs, is a Turkish low-cost carrier headquartered in the Kurtköy area of Pendik, Istanbul with bases at several Turkish airports.

History

On 1 December 1989, two businesses, Net and Silkar, partnered with Aer Lingus to create an inclusive tour charter airline called Pegasus Airlines and services were inaugurated on 15 April 1990 with two Boeing 737-400s. In Greek mythology, Pegasus (Greek: Πήγασος Pégasos, 'strong') was a winged horse sired by Poseidon, in his role as horse-god, and foaled by the Gorgon Medusa. However, four months after the launch, Iraq invaded Kuwait and the seven-month occupation that followed had a serious effect on Turkish tourism. By 1992, tourists began returning to the country and Pegasus grew with the acquisition of a third 737-400. The airline leased a further two Airbus A320s to meet the summer demand.

After two positive years, Aer Lingus and Net sold their shares in the company in 1994 to Istanbul-based Yapı Kredi bank, making Pegasus a purely Turkish company.

On 4 September 1997, Pegasus placed an order for one 737-400 and one 737-800 from Boeing Commercial Airplanes, making it the first Turkish carrier to place an order for the Boeing 737 Next Generation. The airline also signed lease agreements for a further 10 737-800s from the ILFC.

In January 2005, ESAS Holdings purchased Pegasus Airlines and placed Ali Sabanci as the chairman. Two months later, he changed the airline from a charter airline to a low-cost airline. In November 2005, Pegasus placed an order for 12 new 737-800s from Boeing, which was backed up with an order for a further 12 737-800s in November 2008. The latter order had flexibility, as the orders could be changed to the 149-seat 737-700 or the 215-seat 737-900 depending on market demand. In 2018, Pegasus tried to acquire an A380 but later cancelled the order.

In 2007, Pegasus had reached a domestic market share of 15%, which grew to 27% in 2013. In 2019, it carried a total of 29.87 million passengers.

In November 2011, Air Berlin and Pegasus Airlines launched Air Berlin Turkey, which was aimed at the charter market between Germany and Turkey. The new airline however was absorbed into Pegasus Airlines on 31 March 2013.

In 2012, Pegasus Airlines, the second-largest airline in Turkey, signed for up to 100 A320neo Family aircraft (57 A320neo and 18 A321neo models), of which 75 were firm orders. Pegasus became a new Airbus customer and the first Turkish airline to order the A320neo. This was the largest single commercial aircraft order ever placed by an airline in Turkey at that time and was announced on 18 December 2012 at a ceremony attended by Binali Yıldırım, the Turkish Minister of Transport. In June 2012, Pegasus Airlines bought 49% of the Kyrgyz air company Air Manas. On 22 March 2013, the air company operated its first flight under the brand name Pegasus Asia.

The company offered 34.5% of its shares of stock to the public.

In October 2016, Pegasus Airlines announced it was offering three of its aircraft on the ACMI and leasing markets, stating severely decreasing passenger numbers.

Corporate affairs

Cabin
Pegasus Airlines operates a one-class interior configuration on all of its aircraft. A "Flying Cafe" is available to all passengers whereby food and beverages are provided for an additional charge. Pegasus is also considering installing in-flight entertainment and charging for headphones (currently, only overhead screens are available on selected 737-800s and they only display a computer-generated map showing the flight's progress). All new Boeing 737-800s arrived after November 2011 have Boeing Sky Interior.

Training and maintenance
Unlike most low-cost carriers, Pegasus runs its own flight crew training centre and maintenance organisation, Pegasus Technic. Both centres are fully licensed and are used to train new staff members both on the ground and in the air.

Sponsorships
Pegasus Airlines was one of the official sponsors of Nef Stadium, the stadium of Turkish Football Club Galatasaray S.K. from 2011 to 2013.

Destinations

Codeshare agreements
Pegasus Airlines has codeshare agreements with the following airlines:

 Delta Air Lines
 Flynas
 ITA Airways
 KLM
 Nile Air
 Qatar Airways

Fleet

Current fleet
, the Pegasus Airlines fleet consists of the following:

Historic fleet
 Airbus A300
 Boeing 737-300
 Boeing 737-400
 Boeing 737-500

Incidents and accidents
 On 10 March 2010, Pegasus Airlines Flight 361, an Airbus A319 operated by IZair on a ferry flight, made an emergency landing at Frankfurt Airport, Germany after a malfunction in the nose gear. The flight landed safely but blew both front nose gear tires. The airport closed runway 07R/25L for 3 hours to allow recovery. The nose gear suffered the same problem as JetBlue Flight 292.
 On 7 February 2014, Pegasus Airlines Flight 751, a Boeing 737, was the victim of an attempted hijacking by Ukrainian passenger Artem Kozlov who claimed he had a bomb on board. The passenger demanded to be flown to Sochi, the host city of the 2014 Winter Olympics, where the Opening Ceremony was taking place. The plane landed safely in Istanbul.
 On 13 January 2018, Pegasus Airlines Flight 8622, a Boeing 737-800 (registration ) from Ankara Esenboğa Airport, Ankara to Trabzon Airport, veered off the wet runway at Trabzon, slid into the ground of an acutely angled cliff, and got stuck in the mud, which prevented the 41-tonne fuselage from skidding into the Black Sea. All 168 people on board survived and there were no reported injuries. The aircraft sustained substantial damage.
 On 7 January 2020, Pegasus Airlines Flight 747, a Boeing 737-800 (registration ), overran the runway on landing at Istanbul Sabiha Gökçen International Airport (IATA: SAW). All on board evacuated via slides. There were no injuries.
 On 5 February 2020, Pegasus Airlines Flight 2193, a Boeing 737-800 (registration ), overran the runway on landing at Istanbul Sabiha Gökçen International Airport (IATA: SAW). The fuselage broke into three segments and an engine caught fire. Three passengers were killed and 179 were injured.
 On 26 January 2021, Pegasus Airlines Flight PC939, an Airbus A320-251N, touched down on runway 15 at Basel Mulhouse-Freiburg EuroAirport with the nose landing gear rotated 90 degrees. The nosegear tyres ruptured as a result of the friction.

Data breach
A vulnerability in software developed by Turkish airline Pegasus has left 6.5 terabytes of data exposed online. The data breach, which comprises 23 million files including personal information of flight crew, is thought to have originated from a misconfigured ‘bucket’ on Amazon's cloud service AWS.

See also
 Pegasus Asia

References

External links
 
 

 
Turkish brands
Airlines established in 1989
Airlines of Turkey
Sabancı family
Companies based in Istanbul
Companies listed on the Istanbul Stock Exchange
Airlines established in 1990
Pendik
Low-cost carriers
Turkish companies established in 1990